This is a list of lovers rock artists. This includes artists who have either been very important to the genre, or have had a considerable amount of exposure (such as in the case of one that has been on a major label). Groups are listed by the first letter in their first name (not including the words "a", "an", or "the"), and individuals are listed by last name.

A
 Jean Adebambo
 Toyin Adekale
 Marcia Aitken
 Alaine
 Ambelique
 Horace Andy
 Mike Anthony
 Antonio
 Arema
 Aswad

B
 Beshara
 Barry Biggs
 Barry Boom
 Ken Boothe
 Judy Boucher
 Dennis Bovell
 Dennis Brown
 Brown Sugar

C
 Fil Callender
 Al Campbell
 Don Campbell
 Cassandra
 The Chosen Few
 The Cool Notes
 Sandra Cross

D
Carlene Davis
 Junior Delgado
 Keith Douglas
 Errol Dunkley

E
 Alton Ellis
 Hortense Ellis
 Junior English

F
 15,16,17
 Sharon Forrester

G
 Boris Gardiner
 Deborahe Glasgow
 Michael Gordon
 Marcia Griffiths

H
 Audrey Hall
 Beres Hammond
 Trevor Hartley
 Josh Heinrichs
 John Holt
 Peter Hunnigale

I
 The Instigators
 The Investigators
 Gregory Isaacs

J
 Tex Johnson
 Barbara Jones
 Vivian Jones
 Nerious Joseph

K
 Janet Kay
 Pat Kelly
 Kofi
 Bobby Kray
Calvin King

L
 Janet Lee Davis
 Phillip Leo
 June Lodge
 Eddie Lovette

M
 Leroy Mafia
 Donna Marie
 Louisa Mark
 Freddie McGregor
 Freddie McKay
 Bitty McLean
 John McLean
 Me and You
 Sugar Minott
 Portia Morgan
 Neville Morrison
 Motion
 Junior Murvin

N
 Pam Nestor

P
 Frankie Paul
 Dawn Penn
 Marie Pierre
 Maxi Priest

R
 Danny Ray
 Winston Reedy
 Junior Reid
 Revelation
 Donna Rhoden
 Tarrus Riley
 Riot Squad
Romain Virgo
 Samantha Rose
 T.T. Ross

S
 Sanchez
 Dee Sharp
 Pluto Shervington
 Leroy Simmons
 Singing Melody
 Peter Spence
 Richie Stephens

T
 The Tamlins
 Sylvia Tella
 Nicky Thomas
 Ruddy Thomas
 Carroll Thompson
 Tradition

U

V
 Romain Virgo
 Vivian Jones

W
 Wayne Wade
 Trevor Walters
 Caron Wheeler
 Ginger Williams
 Delroy Wilson
 Winsome
 Wayne Wonder
 Wendy Walker

Notes

References
Abbott, Diane (2011) "And now... The Story Of Lovers' Rock", Jamaica Observer, 25 September 2011, retrieved 2012-06-05
Barrow, Steve & Dalton, Peter (2004) The Rough Guide to Reggae, 3rd edn., Rough Guides, 
Hebdige, Dick (1987) Cut 'n' Mix: Culture, Identity and Caribbean Music, Routledge, 
Larkin, Colin (1998) The Virgin Encyclopedia of Reggae, Virgin Books, 

 
Lovers rock